Jennifer A. Glancy is a scholar of New Testament and Early Christianity and The Rev. Kevin G. O’Connell, S.J., Distinguished Teaching Professor in the Humanities at Le Moyne College in Syracuse, NY. Her expertise lies in the cultural history of early Christianity, with a special emphasis on corporeality and Christian anthropology, women’s history in antiquity, gender theory, and comparative studies of slavery. Her book Slavery in Early Christianity (2002) was chosen as a History Book Club selection.

Career 
Glancy completed in 1982 a BA Honors degree in Philosophy and English Literature at Swarthmore College. For her doctoral studies, she moved on to Columbia University where she in obtained an MA degree in 1986 and a PhD in Religion in 1990. Since 1990, she has served a professor at Le Moyne College. During a period of leave from 2008 to 2010, Glancy served as the George and Sallie Cutchin Camp Professor of Bible at the University of Richmond, Virginia.

At Le Moyne College she has been honored as both Teacher of the Year and Scholar of the Year. Glancy is also the recipient of a 2017 Summer Stipend from the National Endowment for the Humanities for current research, “The Ancient Christian Understanding of Slavery and Contemporary Discourse on the Meaning of Being Human.”

Slavery in early Christianity

Much of Glancy's career has revolved around slavery as conceived in the biblical texts as well as in early Christian history, with a focus on the sexual exploitation that slaves were subject and vulnerable to and the use of their bodies in antiquity. Her most prominent work on this subject is her book Slavery in Early Christianity (Oxford 2002). Jennifer Knust has described her work as "challenging". J. Albert Hill has entered into debate with Glancy regarding the interpretation of slavery as described in parables in the Gospels, where Harrill has argued that the parables have no meaning outside of their literary framework and need to be interpreted solely in a literary framework, whereas Glancy seeks to demonstrate that one needs to move past their literary framework and examine their real-life implications and suggestions of the role that enslavement plays in the parables. Larry Hurtado has criticized and argued that Glancy's interpretation of slaves and slavery in the letters of Paul are "interpretive violence".

Works

Thesis

Books

Journal articles

References 

Year of birth missing (living people)
Living people
Le Moyne College faculty
Swarthmore College alumni
Columbia University alumni
New Testament scholars
Female biblical scholars
Members of the Jesus Seminar